Elisabeth Charlotta Karsten, married surname Kachanoff (1789–1856), was a Swedish painter.

She was born in Stockholm, the daughter of Kristofer Kristian Karsten and Sophie Stebnowska and sister of Sophie Karsten. She was the student of Carl Johan Fahlcrantz. Karsten was a landscape painter and copied in oil from the work, among others, Ruysdael and Vernet. She used oil and  gouache. she was represented on the exhibitions of the Royal Swedish Academy of Arts in Stockholm between 1804 and 1810.

She married the Russian general Simeon Kachanoff in 1818, and moved with him to Dagestan.

References 

 Anteckningar om svenska qvinnor , 1866
 Europas konstnärer, 1887
 Dahlberg och Hagström: Svenskt konstlexikon. Allhems Förlag (1953) Malmö.
Svenskt konstnärslexikon del III sid 357 Allhems Förlag Malmö

1789 births
1856 deaths
19th-century Swedish painters
19th-century Swedish women artists
Swedish emigrants to the Russian Empire
Swedish people of Polish descent
19th-century people from the Russian Empire
Swedish women painters
Swedish landscape painters